The World Group was the highest level of Federation Cup competition in 1991. Thirty-two nations competed in a five-round knockout competition from 22–28 July. United States was the two-time defending champion, but Spain won the final to claim its first title.

Participating Teams

Draw

First round

United States vs. Netherlands

Hungary vs. Bulgaria

Finland vs. Romania

Portugal vs. Austria

Switzerland vs. Argentina

Brazil vs. China

Czechoslovakia vs. Sweden

Paraguay vs. Soviet Union

Great Britain vs. New Zealand

Israel vs. Italy

Canada vs. Denmark

Greece vs. Germany

France vs. Poland

Yugoslavia vs. Indonesia

Australia vs. Japan

Belgium vs. Spain

Second round

United States vs. Bulgaria

Finland vs. Austria

Switzerland vs. China

Czechoslovakia vs. Soviet Union

Great Britain vs. Italy

Canada vs. Germany

Poland vs. Indonesia

Australia vs. Spain

Quarterfinals

United States vs. Austria

Switzerland vs. Czechoslovakia

Italy vs. Germany

Indonesia vs. Spain

Semifinals

United States vs. Czechoslovakia

Germany vs. Spain

Final

United States vs. Spain

References

External links
 Fed Cup website

World Group